Jeyankondanilai is a head village in singampunari taluk, Sivaganga district in the Indian state of Tamil Nadu. 

This village is predominantly Kallar village with a minor section of SC community and a couple of families of other castes. This village is a close knit community with almost all families inter related to each other in one way or other. Outside influence has been minimal.

As of the 2011 census, it had a total population of 2,059; 1,082 males and 977 females, of which 269 were children aged 0-6.  The literacy rate was 81.01%; 89.14% for males and 72.03% for females.

References

Villages in Sivaganga district